Thaliyadichapuram Sree Mahadeva Temple is a Hindu temple located in Nemom, 7 km from Thiruvananthapuram, Kerala. The word 'Thali' refers to a Shiva temple; however, the temple complex also houses  shrines Lord Ganesh, Lord Ayyappa and  Nagaraja.

This temple is one of the few Thali temples in Kerala.
near the temple there is a pond [kolam]. As of 2014 the temple is run by Travancore devasom board.

See also
 List of Hindu temples in Kerala

Hindu temples in Thiruvananthapuram district
Shiva temples in Kerala
Temples dedicated to Jagannath